William Wolfgang Hallo (March 9, 1928 – March, 27, 2015) was professor of Assyriology and Babylonian Literature and curator of the Babylonian collection at Yale University. He was born in Kassel, Germany.

Hallo was a Master of Morse College, one of the twelve residential colleges at Yale University, between 1982 and 1987.

Hallo and Van Dijk were known for publishing the first translations and book-length discussion of the work of the Sumerian priestess and poet Enheduanna in 1968.

Biography
Born in Kassel, Germany, in 1928, Hallo left Germany in 1939 for England, and immigrated to the United States with his family in 1941. He received his B.A. from Harvard and studied in the Netherlands through a Fulbright Fellowship at the University of Leiden. There he met and married Edith Pinto, with whom he had two children. After the death of Edith in 1994, he married Nanette Stahl.

Hallo studied for his Ph.D. 1951–1956 at the Oriental Institute with a fellowship from the University of Chicago under Professor I.J. Gelb. After receiving his Ph.D., he worked at Hebrew Union College’s Jewish Institute of Religion. In 1962, Hallo became assistant curator (and later curator) of the Babylonian Collection and professor of Assyriology at Yale, which he taught until his retirement in 2002.

Works

Translations

References

American Assyriologists
Jewish emigrants from Nazi Germany to the United States
2015 deaths
Yale University faculty
1928 births
University of Chicago alumni
Harvard University alumni
Assyriologists